Ivonne Schröder (born 25July 1988) is a German ice hockey player for Tornado Niesky and the German national team.

She participated at the 2015 IIHF Women's World Championship.

References

External links
 
 

1988 births
Living people
German women's ice hockey goaltenders
People from Bad Muskau
Sportspeople from Saxony